Waldo Ralph Fimmen (June 3, 1899 – May 20, 1968), was an American politician from the state of Iowa.

Fimmen was born June 3, 1899, in Des Moines County, Iowa to Henry Fimmen and Lily Westling. He graduated from Burlington High School in 1917. Fimmen married Mildred Wharton in 1931. He served as a Republican in the Iowa House of Representatives from 1941 to 1949. Fimmen died May 20, 1968 in Bloomfield, leaving behind his wife Mildred and daughter Barbara. He was interred in Bloomfield I.O.O.F. Cemetery in Bloomfield, Davis County, Iowa.

References

1899 births
1968 deaths
People from Bloomfield, Iowa
Republican Party members of the Iowa House of Representatives
20th-century American politicians